Composition is a 1921 painting by Jozef Peeters. It is now catalogue number in 2924 in the Royal Museum of Fine Arts, Antwerp.

References

1921 paintings
Belgian paintings
Paintings in the collection of the Royal Museum of Fine Arts Antwerp